Metasia homophaea is a moth in the family Crambidae. It was described by Edward Meyrick in 1885. It is found in Australia, where it has been recorded from New South Wales.

References

Moths described in 1885
Metasia